Knoller is a surname. Notable people with the surname include:

David Knoller, American producer, director, and writer
Mark Knoller, American journalist
Martin Knoller (1725–1804), Austrian-Italian painter
Ohad Knoller (born 1976), Israeli actor